Edmond Auguste Mulet Lesieur (born 13 March 1951) is a Guatemalan diplomat, lawyer and notary public. He was appointed Head of the independent three-member panel to lead the Organisation for the Prohibition of Chemical Weapons (OPCW)-United Nations Joint Investigative Mechanism on 27 April 2017. Mulet served as the last Chief of Staff to former United Nations Secretary-General Ban Ki-moon. Previously, he was Assistant Secretary-General for Peacekeeping Operations at the United Nations. He was appointed to this position on 2 June 2011. He was the Special Representative of the Secretary-General and head of mission of MINUSTAH, having assumed the functions of acting head of mission in the immediate aftermath of the 2010 Haiti earthquake, in which the previous head of mission, Hédi Annabi of Tunisia, perished. Mulet served a previous term in this position between June 2006 and August 2007.

Immediately prior to taking up his post, he was United Nations Assistant Secretary-General for Peacekeeping Operations. Prior to this, he was Guatemala's ambassador to the European Union, the Kingdom of Belgium and the Grand Duchy of Luxembourg where he represented his country in the preparatory negotiations for free trade agreements between Latin America and the Caribbean and the European Union.

Personal life 
Mulet received his primary education in Guatemala City, Montreal, New York City and Bern. He studied law and social studies at Guatemala City's Universidad Mariano Galvez. He is married and has two sons. He is fluent in Spanish, English and French.

Career
During the 1980s, he ran into trouble with the law, which accused him of belonging to an illegal adoption ring that facilitated the departure of babies from the country, posing as tourists. In 1981, he was arrested for this.

Mulet was first elected to Congress in 1982. He was a candidate to the 1984 National Constituent Assembly, and was re-elected to Congress for the period 1986–1991. In 1990, he was re-elected for the period 1991–1996. During his years in Congress, he was involved in the Central American peace process, the Esquipulas Accords, and the Guatemalan Peace negotiations. He was also a member of the Guatemalan-Belize Commission, first as a representative of Congress and later as a delegate from the executive branch. In 1992 he became President of Congress.

In 1993, he was appointed Ambassador to the United States, a post from which he resigned following the self-coup of President Jorge Serrano Elías in 1993. Following the restoration of democratic rule, Mulet resumed his functions until 1996. During those years, he was a regular lecturer at think-tanks, universities and colleges across the Americas, and at the Foreign Service Institute in Washington, D.C. Upon his return to Guatemala in 1996, he was elected general secretary of the Unión del Centro Nacional party.

Mulet served as the United Nations Special Representative for Haiti from 2005 to 2007.

On 27 July 2007, United Nations Secretary-General Ban Ki-moon announced his intention to appoint Mulet as Assistant Secretary-General for Peacekeeping Operations, effective 1 September.

On 31 March 2010, Mulet was appointed by the United Nations Secretary-General Ban Ki-moon as his Special Representative and Head of the United Nations Stabilization Mission in Haiti (MINUSTAH). He succeeded late Hédi Annabi of Tunisia, who perished in the 2010 Haiti earthquake.

On 2 June 2011, Mulet was re-appointed by United Nations Secretary-General Ban Ki-moon as Assistant Secretary-General for Peacekeeping Operations, a position Mulet had previously held from 2007 to 2010 before being deployed to Haiti.

He was a candidate in the 2019 Presidential Election, obtaining 11% of the vote in the first round. Defining himself as centrist, he opposes the legalization of marriage for same-sex couples and the right to abortion.

References

External links
UN BiographyEdmond Mulet
MINUSTAH Leadership

Guatemalan diplomats
Guatemalan officials of the United Nations
Members of the Congress of Guatemala
Presidents of the Congress of Guatemala
1951 births
Living people
Ambassadors of Guatemala to the European Union
Ambassadors of Guatemala to Belgium
Ambassadors of Guatemala to Luxembourg
Ambassadors of Guatemala to the United States
People from Guatemala City
20th-century Guatemalan people
21st-century Guatemalan people
Universidad Mariano Gálvez alumni